Notte prima degli esami (English: Night Before the Exams) is a 2006 Italian comedy teen film,  written and directed by Fausto Brizzi. It describes the lives of two groups of Italian teenagers during the preparation of the esame di maturità (the final exam of Italian high school). It is set in Rome during the year 1989.

The inspiration for the title was a famous 1980s song by Antonello Venditti.

Plot
The film follows two teenagers, Luca (Nicolas Vaporidis) and Claudia (Cristiana Capotondi), and their friends as they all prepare for the dreaded maturità (high school graduation) exams during the summer of 1989. At a party, Luca meets and immediately falls for Claudia. The film then follows both teenagers and their friends through their various personal experiences and adventures during the summer. In addition, throughout the film, Luca is desperately trying to get back in favour with his literature teacher (Giorgio Faletti), who will be the teacher sitting in on his oral exams.

The film contains many references to music that was popular in the 1980s, and includes songs of the time period by bands such as Europe, Duran Duran ("Save a Prayer" and "The Wild Boys"), and Cecchetto ("Gioca Jouer").

Sequels and remakes
A sequel, Notte prima degli esami – Oggi was released in 2007.  The sequel features many of the same actors playing the same characters they played in the original, but it is set in 2006, during Italy's World Cup winning summer. And in 2011, Italian television station Rai Uno aired Notte prima degli esami '82, a two-part miniseries involving many of the same characters as the first two movies, but using mostly different actors and setting the story in the summer of 1982.

A French remake of the original movie, titled Nos 18 ans, was released in 2008.

References

External links
 Notte prima degli esami (Official site)
 

2006 films
2000s teen comedy films
Films set in 1989
Films directed by Fausto Brizzi
Films produced by Fulvio Lucisano
Films scored by Bruno Zambrini
Italian teen comedy films
2006 comedy films
Italian high school films
Films set in Rome
2000s Italian-language films